Louisa Berkeley, Countess of Berkeley (24 December 1694 – 15 January 1716), formerly Lady Louisa Lennox, was the first wife of James Berkeley, 3rd Earl of Berkeley.

She was the older daughter of Charles Lennox, 1st Duke of Richmond, and his wife, the former Anne Brudenell.

She married the Earl of Berkeley  on 13 February 1711. At the time of her wedding, Jonathan Swift said of her: "the chit is but 17 and is ill-natured, covetous, vicious and proud in extremes."

They had two children:

Lt. Col. Augustus Berkeley, 4th Earl of Berkeley (18 February 1715 – 9 January 1755)
Lady Elizabeth Berkeley (15 January 1716 - died 1745), who married Anthony Henley  

The countess died of smallpox, aged 21, and was buried at St Mary's Church, Berkeley.

From 1714 until her death, she was a Lady of the Bedchamber to Caroline of Ansbach, Princess of Wales.

References

1694 births
1716 deaths
Louisa
Daughters of British dukes
English countesses
Ladies of the Bedchamber
Household of Caroline of Brandenburg-Ansbach